Fiesta Mart, L.L.C., formerly Fiesta Mart Inc., is a Latino-American supermarket chain based in Houston, Texas that was established in 1972. Fiesta Mart stores are located in Texas. The chain uses a cartoon parrot as a mascot. As of 2004 it operated 34 supermarkets in Greater Houston, 16 supermarkets in other locations in Texas, and 17 Beverage Mart liquor store locations. During the same year it had 7.5% of the grocery market share in Greater Houston. Many of its stores were located in Hispanic neighborhoods and other minority neighborhoods.

The chain caters Hispanic and other foods also serves hot cooked breakfast, lunch and dinner for customers; Allison Wollam of the Houston Business Journal said "The company has been successful at targeting the Hispanic market and specifically catering to their needs and shopping styles." Bernie Murphy, a spokesperson for Fiesta, said in 2006 that at some stores Hispanics make up to 70% of those stores's clientele. Fiesta caters to these customers with a large selection of foods and ingredients that are generally not available at a typical grocery store. Fiesta stores also often include several other stores owned by independent operators, such as discount jewelry and banking. Fiesta also operates Fiesta Liquor Stores, where only alcohol is sold.

History
In 1972, Donald Bonham and O.C. Mendenhall started Fiesta; neither of the men had Hispanic ethnic backgrounds. Bonham had farmed in Belize and Guatemala and supervised the creation of a Chilean supermarket chain. When Bonham returned to Texas, he believed that Houston-area businesses did not adequately cater to Mexican Americans, a large segment of the city's population. Bonham opened the first Fiesta, which catered exclusively to Hispanic Americans, in the Near Northside.

As the demographics of Houston changed, by the late 1970s Fiesta added African, Indian, Korean, Filipino, and Vietnamese items. By the mid-1980s Fiesta had 15 stores. By 1989 the stores also featured items catering to African Americans and Thai Americans. By that year Fiesta had $420 million in annual sales, including $25 million in apparel sales. As the chain developed, its clientele became larger and included second and third-generation Hispanics.

In the late 1980s and early 1990s, Fiesta operated a very large supermarket and general goods store, an early version of modern supercenters like Walmart Supercenter or SuperTarget, at the southwest side of the intersection of I-45 and Texas State Highway NASA Road 1 in Webster, TX. This store was targeted towards the surrounding community, which was one of the more affluent Houston suburbs. It featured a large, sloped hydroponic garden along the north wall. The floor space was slowly sold off in portions in the 1990s. As of 2011, the location is now called the NASA Value Center Shopping Center and has no Fiesta presence.

In 1994, Fiesta acquired four locations sold by Appletree Markets. In 1998 Fiesta made a marketing agreement with Conoco Inc. to allow the gas station chain to build gas stations on the properties of Fiesta supermarkets. In 1999 Fiesta had 10.9% of Houston's grocery market.

In 2003 the Houston Press ranked Fiesta as the "Best Grocery Store" in Houston.

In 2004, Fiesta Mart was acquired by Grocers Supply, a family owned Houston-based wholesale groceries distributor. On July 23, 2008 Fiesta Mart acquired eleven Carnival Brand stores from Minyard Food Stores. In 2015 the Levit family, the owners of Grocers Supply, sold Fiesta to Acon Investments, a company based in Washington, DC.  California-based Bodega Latina and its Mexican parent company Chedraui acquired Fiesta Mart from Acon in April 2018.

Headquarters and locations
The headquarters is on Westheimer Road.

The headquarters was in the Cottage Grove area of Houston for many many years.

The property was sold and the office moved the Capital One building on Westheimer Road near the Galleria in 2018.

Locations:
 Greater Austin
 Austin (2 locations)
 Dallas/Fort Worth Metroplex
 Arlington
 Carrollton
 Dallas (11 Fiesta locations, 1 Carnival location)
 Fort Worth (7 Fiesta locations, 1 Carnival location)
 Garland (2 locations)
 Irving (2 locations)
 Plano
 Greater Houston
 Conroe
 Unincorporated Harris County (3 locations)
 Houston (27 locations)
 Missouri City
 Rosenberg
 South Houston

Former stores
Beaumont, Texas (1994–1995, site is now the headquarters of Conn's, Inc., a chain of electronics/appliance stores in Texas, Louisiana, and Oklahoma)
Grand Prairie, Texas  (Carnival food store 1999–2008; SAVERS COST + PLUS  2008–present)
1 location in Spring Branch, Houston – Now 99 Ranch Market
Montrose, Houston (1994–2012), site is intended to be an apartment complex development
 Midtown Houston
 Sugar Land
 The Sugar Land Sugar Creek Fiesta Market Place store opened in a former Gerland's location in July 2013. The store included the first Caribou Coffee outlet in the state of Texas, a Market Place Eatery restaurant with meal offerings, and a Red Mango yogurt shop. In March 2014 Fiesta announced that the store will close on April 20, 2014.

References

Further reading
 Smith, Camilo. "Six Cool Things With Cross-Cultural Appeal That You Can Find at Fiesta Mart." Houston Press. Wednesday April 2, 2014.

External links

 Fiesta Mart website

Supermarkets of the United States
Companies based in Houston
Retail companies established in 1972
1972 establishments in Texas